Netz 107 is a General Dynamics F-16A block 10 Fighting Falcon of the Israeli Air Force, tail number 107. Netz 107 participated in Operation Opera, bombing the Osiraq nuclear reactor, and was later credited with 6.5 enemy aircraft kills, a world record number of kills for an F-16.

Operational service 

The first F-16A/B Netz fighters arrived in Israel during 1980 and were issued to 117 Squadron (Israel) of the Israeli Air Force. Netz 107 was the first F-16 to touch Israeli soil when it landed on 2 July 1980 at Ramat David Airbase.

On 7 June 1981 Netz 107 took part in Operation Opera, piloted by Amos Yadlin, and was the second F-16 to strike the Osiraq nuclear reactor after wing leader Zeev Raz.

Netz 107 scored its first aerial kill on 21 April 1982 when pilot Zeev Raz shot down a Syrian Air Force MiG-23. During Operation Peace for Galilee it shot down 6 more Syrian aircraft. On 9 June 1982, Eliezer Shkedi shot down two MiG-23s, although one was shared with another pilot. On Friday 11 June 1982 pilot Eytan Stibbe shot down four Syrian aircraft.

Several years later Netz 107 was re-allocated to 253 Squadron (Israel) along with other F-16A/Bs. In 2015 it was retired from service and put on display at the Israeli Air Force Museum.

Kills

References

External links 

 אלוף ההפלות: זהו איתן סטיבה – האסטרונאוט הישראלי October 2020 (Hebrew)
IAF F-16s kill tallies in F-16.net
 Record-breaking F-16 Falcon to be retired from IDF service, ynet, 11 February 2015
 xnir photography, IAF F-16 Netz 107 photo gallery in Flickr
 מטוס האף־16 שהפיל הכי הרבה מטוסי אויב פורש לפנסיה במוזיאון חיל האוויר, ידיעות אחרונות, 9 February 2015 (Hebrew)
 איתן סטיבה מתאר הפלת 2 מטוסי סוחוי-22, מטוס מיג 23 ומסוק גאזל ב-11.6.1982 , באתר "מרקיע שחקים" (Hebrew)
 IAF F-16 Netz 107, photos in Flickr

Israeli Air Force
General Dynamics F-16 Fighting Falcon
Individual aircraft